The Daughter (translit. I Kori) is a 2012 Greek drama film directed by Thanos Anastopoulos. It was screened in the City to City section at the 2013 Toronto International Film Festival.

Cast
 Savina Alimani as Myrto
 Angelos Papadimas as Aggelos
 Giorgos Symeonidis as Father
 Ieronymos Kaletsanos as Business Partner
 Ornela Kapetani as Mother
 Theodora Tzimou as Business Partner's Wife

References

External links
 

2012 films
2012 drama films
Greek drama films
2010s Greek-language films